Ivan Vladislavovich Zaitsev (Иван Владиславович Зайцев, born 11 March 1975 in Norilsk) is a Russian born Kazakhstani male water polo player. He was a member of the Kazakhstan men's national water polo team, playing as a driver. He was a part of the  team at the 2000 Summer Olympics and 2004 Summer Olympics. On club level he played for Dynamo Moscow in Russia.

References

1975 births
Living people
Kazakhstani male water polo players
Water polo players at the 2000 Summer Olympics
Water polo players at the 2004 Summer Olympics
Olympic water polo players of Kazakhstan
People from Norilsk
Water polo players at the 1998 Asian Games
Water polo players at the 2002 Asian Games
Water polo players at the 2006 Asian Games
Asian Games medalists in water polo
Asian Games gold medalists for Kazakhstan
Asian Games bronze medalists for Kazakhstan
Medalists at the 1998 Asian Games
Medalists at the 2002 Asian Games
Medalists at the 2006 Asian Games